The 1998 Toulon Tournament was the 26th edition of the Toulon Tournament. The competition took place between 14 May and 23 May 1998  mostly in the Provence-Alpes-Côte d'Azur region of South Eastern France. Argentina achieved their second title, beating France 2–0 in the Final.

Participants

  (hosts)

Venues
The matches were played in these communes:

Arles
Aubagne
Cannes
La Seyne-sur-Mer
Lorges
Mallemort	
Manosque
Nîmes	
Six-Fours-les-Plages
Toulon

Results

Group A

Group B

All times local (CEST)

Knockout stage

Semi-finals

Third place play-off

Final

References

External links 
Toulon Tournament RSSSF

1998
1997–98 in French football
1998 in youth association football